Medeweger See is a lake in Mecklenburg-Vorpommern, Germany. At an elevation of 39.4 m, its surface area is 0.95 km².

External links 
 

Lakes of Mecklenburg-Western Pomerania